Peter William Clayden (20 October 1827 – 19 February 1902) was a British Nonconformist and Liberal journalist and author.

Life
Clayden was a Unitarian minister from 1855 to 1868. He edited the Boston Guardian and wrote on political and social topics for the Edinburgh Review and the Cornhill Magazine. He strongly supported the North in the American Civil War.

In 1866 he started to write for the Daily News, relinquishing his ministry in 1868 to become a member of its regular staff in London as a leader writer and assistant editor. In 1887 he was appointed night editor, which he would hold until 1896. Clayden strongly supported William Ewart Gladstone's anti-Turkish stance over the Eastern Question and chronicled his times from a Liberal perspective in various books.

He wrote (or compiled and edited) biographies of a notable uncle and nephew, Samuel Sharpe, Egyptologist and Translator of the Bible (1883), The Early Life of Samuel Rogers (1887) and Rogers and his Contemporaries (1889), described as "a standard Victorian life-and-letters volume, which is to say that it consists of transcripts of manuscript letters interspersed with connecting biographical material supplied by the editor." In 1887, Clayden married into the family, choosing as his second wife Rogers's great-niece Ellen Sharpe.

Works
England Under Lord Beaconsfield (1880).
Five Years of Liberal and Six Years of Conservative Government (1880).
England Under the Coalition, 1885-1892 (1892).
Armenia: The Case Against Lord Salisbury (1897).

Notes

Further reading
S. E. Koss, The Rise and Fall of the Political Press in Britain, 2 vols. (1981, 1984); repr. (1990).

External links

1827 births
1902 deaths
British journalists
British Unitarians
Liberal Party (UK) politicians